Wu–Hua (Ng-faa, 吳化方言) is a branch of Yue Chinese spoken in Guangdong province composed of two dialects:
Wuchuan dialect
Huazhou dialect

References

Yue Chinese